Bannerton is a locality situated in the Sunraysia region.  The place by road, is situated about 8 kilometres west from Powell and 13 kilometres south from Robinvale.

The Post Office opened in February 1924 as Banner, was renamed Tol Tol later in 1924 and Bannerton in 1926, closing in 1974.

References

Towns in Victoria (Australia)
Rural City of Swan Hill